Hidvégi is a Hungarian surname. Notable people with the surname include:

 László Hidvégi (1916–2003), Hungarian diver
 Máté Hidvégi (born 1955), Hungarian biochemist
 Sándor Hidvégi (born 1983), Hungarian footballer

Hungarian-language surnames